A list of films produced by the Marathi language film industry based in Maharashtra in the year 1979.

1979 Releases
A list of Marathi films released in 1979.

References

Lists of 1979 films by country or language
1979
1979 in Indian cinema